The 1945 All-Southern Conference football team consists of American football players chosen by coaches and sports writers on behalf of the Associated Press (AP) and United Press (UP) as the best at each position from the Southern Conference during the 1945 college football season.

All-Southern Conference selections

Backs
 Howard Turner, NC State (AP-1, UP-1 [qb])
 Nick Sacrinty, Wake Forest (AP-1, UP-1 [hb)
 George Clark, Duke (AP-1, UP-1 [hb])
 Lynn Chewning, VMI (AP-1, UP-1 [fb])
 T. Korzcowski, William & Mary (AP-2)
 Gordon Carver, Duke (AP-2, UP-2)
 Bob Thomason, VMI (AP-2)
 Rock Brinkley, Wake Forest (AP-2, UP-2)
 John Kniza, Duke (UP-2)
 Marion Butler, Clemson (UP-2)

Ends
 Kelley Mote, Duke (AP-1, UP-1)
 Dave Harris, Wake Forest (AP-1, UP-1)
 Denver Mills (AP-2, UP-2)
 Lum Edwards (AP-2, UP-2)

Tackles
 Knox Ramsey, William & Mary (AP-1)
 Malachi Mill, VMI (AP-1)
 Robert Turner, Clemson (UP-1)
 Ed Sharkey, Duke (UP-1)
 Ted Hazelwood, North Carolina (AP-2)
 Ross Orr, Virginia Tech (AP-2)
 Bull Cagle, Clemson (UP-2)
 Ted Marshall (UP-2)

Guards
 Ernie Knotts, Duke (AP-1, UP-1)
 Charles Garrison, Wake Forest (AP-1, UP-2)
 Doc Holloway, William & Mary (AP-2)
 Phil Ball, South Carolina (AP-2, UP-1)
 Footsie Ward, Clemson (UP-2)

Centers
 Ralph Jenkins, Clemson (AP-1, UP-1)
 Dick Foreman, Wake Forest (AP-2, UP-2)

Key

See also
1945 College Football All-America Team

References

All-Southern Conference football team
All-Southern Conference football teams